This is a list of notable events in country music that took place in the year 1958.

Events
January 1 — Johnny Cash performs at San Quentin Prison. One of the audience members is Merle Haggard, in the midst of a two-year prison term for burglary.
February — Struggling singer-songwriter Don Gibson finally gets a career break when his first major hit, "Oh Lonesome Me" reaches No. 1 on Billboard's "C&W Best Sellers in Stores" and "Most Played C&W by Jockeys" charts. The flip side of the single is "I Can't Stop Loving You," which went on to be recorded more than 700 times. Gibson is considered by many to be one of the originators of the Nashville Sound, a form of country music that uses pop music-styled arrangements (such as orchestrated strings) rather than traditional honky-tonk sounds.
March — BMI opens its Nashville office, headed by Frances Preston.
March 24 — Elvis Presley is inducted into the United States Army at the Memphis Draft Board, thus beginning his two years of service.
May — The fledgling career of Jerry Lee Lewis is rocked by scandal when his marriage to second cousin Myra Gale Brown becomes public. A British tour is cancelled, and Lewis' career goes into decline until 1968, when he begins concentrating on country music.
October 13 — Billboard discontinues the "C&W Best Sellers in Stores" and "Most Played C&W by Jockeys" charts. Starting with the October 20 issue, there is one all-encompassing "Hot C&W Sides" chart. The new chart has 30 positions, and "City Lights" by Ray Price is the first No. 1 song.
November — The Country Music Association is founded to promote country music. Harry Stone, the former station manager of WSM, is named executive director.
November — Conway Twitty begins a remarkable career ... in rock and roll, with his hit, "It's Only Make Believe." The song – which contains all the Twitty hallmarks – skyrockets to No. 1 on the Billboard Hot 100 chart in the fall, and begins a string of hits that continues through the early 1960s. Twitty makes the switch to country in the mid-1960s. Although "... Make Believe" is never a country hit, the song has become a country standard in the years since Twitty became a country giant.
 December 26 — Johnny Cash tops a country and western concert at the Showboat Hotel in Las Vegas, Nevada; also appearing are Tex Ritter and the Sons of the Pioneers.

Top hits of the year

Number-one hits

United States
(as certified by Billboard)

Notes
1^ No. 1 song of the year, as determined by Billboard.
2^ Song dropped from No. 1 and later returned to top spot.
A^ First Billboard No. 1 hit for that artist.
B^ Last Billboard No. 1 hit for that artist.

Note: Through October 13, several songs were simultaneous No. 1 hits on the separate "Most Played C&W by Jockeys" and "C&W Best Sellers in Stores" charts. Only one No. 1 per week is possible starting with the "Hot C&W Sides" chart, which begins October 20.

Other major hits

Top new album releases
Foreign Love – Hank Locklin (RCA Victor)
Sings the Songs that Made Him Famous – Johnny Cash (Sun)

Births
 February 21 — Mary Chapin Carpenter, folk-styled country singer of the 1990s.
 February 24 — Sammy Kershaw, neotraditionalist of the 1990s and beyond.
 March 28 — Elisabeth Andreassen, Norwegian female country singer.
 May 23 — Shelly West, country singer of the 1980s, daughter of Dottie West.
 July 3 — Aaron Tippin, honky-tonk styled singer-songwriter of the 1990s and 2000s (decade).
 July 29 — Bobby Jensen, keyboardist from the Western Underground.
 July 30 — Neal McCoy, Asian country singer of the 1990s.
 September 6 — Jeff Foxworthy, comedian best known for "You Must Be a Redneck If ..." tagline; host of eponymously named countdown and "Are You Smarter Than a 5th Grader?" game show.
 September 16 — Terry McBride, lead singer of the 1990s trio McBride & the Ride.
 September 30 — Marty Stuart, neotraditionalist and Grand Ole Opry stalwart.
 October 10 — Tanya Tucker, teen-aged country star of the 1970s, who continued to be a major country star during the 1980s and 1990s.
 October 17 — Alan Jackson, neotraditionalist singer since the 1990s.
 October 25 — Mark Miller, lead singer of Sawyer Brown.
 December 28 — Joe Diffie, honky tonk-styled singer of the 1990s and early 2000s (decade) (d. 2020).

Deaths
 September 12 – Rod Brasfield, 48, comedian who was immensely popular with Grand Ole Opry audiences (heart failure).

Further reading
Kingsbury, Paul, "The Grand Ole Opry: History of Country Music. 70 Years of the Songs, the Stars and the Stories," Villard Books, Random House; Opryland USA, 1995
Kingsbury, Paul, "Vinyl Hayride: Country Music Album Covers 1947–1989," Country Music Foundation, 2003
Millard, Bob, "Country Music: 70 Years of America's Favorite Music," HarperCollins, New York, 1993
Whitburn, Joel, "Top Country Songs 1944–2005 – 6th Edition." 2005.

Other links
Country Music Association

References

Country
Country music by year